Ricinolein is the chief constituent of castor oil and is the triglyceride of ricinoleic acid. Castor oil, the expressed natural fatty oil of the seeds of Ricinus communis also contains mixtures of the glycerides of isoricinoleic acids and much smaller traces of tristearin and the glyceride of dihydroxysteric acid. Ricinolein is the active principle in the use of castor oil as a purgative and solvent for several medically useful alkaloids.

References

Triglycerides
Castor oil plant
Alkene derivatives
Secondary alcohols